The Circus is a historic ring of large townhouses in the city of Bath, Somerset, England, forming a circle with three entrances.  Designed by architect John Wood, the Elder, it was built between 1754 and 1769, and is regarded as a pre-eminent example of Georgian architecture. The name comes from the Latin circus, meaning a ring, oval or circle. It has been designated as a Grade I listed building.

The Circus is divided into three segments of equal length, with a lawn in the centre. Each segment faces one of the three entrances, ensuring a classical façade is always presented straight ahead.

History
The Circus, originally called King's Circus, was designed by the architect John Wood, the Elder.

Wood died less than three months after the first stone was laid; his son, John Wood, the Younger, completed the project to his father's design.  The initial leases for the south west segment were granted in 1755–1767, for the south east segment in 1762–1766, and for the north segment in 1764–1766.

The Circus was part of John Wood the Elder's grand vision to recreate a classical Palladian architectural landscape for the city. Other projects included nearby Queen Square and the never-built Forum. The culmination of Wood's career, the Circus is considered his masterpiece.

The painter Thomas Gainsborough lived in Number 17 between 1758 and 1774, using part of its space as his portrait studio. Number 15 was home to Admiral Sir Richard Bickerton and his family in the first half of the 19th century.

During the Bath Blitz of 25/26 April 1942, one of the Baedeker Blitz retaliatory raids on England following the RAF's raid on Lübeck, a bomb fell into the Circus, demolishing several of the houses. These have since been reconstructed in the original style.

Architectural historian Dan Cruickshank selected the Circus as one of his five choices for the 2006 BBC television documentary series Britain's Best Buildings.

Design
Three Classical orders (Greek Doric, Roman/Composite and Corinthian) are used, one above the other, in the elegant curved facades.  The frieze of the Doric entablature is decorated with alternating triglyphs and 525 pictorial emblems, including serpents, nautical symbols, devices representing the arts and sciences, and Masonic symbols. The parapet is adorned with stone acorn finials.

When viewed from the air, the Circus, along with Queens Square and the adjoining Gay Street, form a key shape, which is a masonic symbol similar to those that adorn many of Wood's buildings.

The central area was originally paved with stone setts, covering a reservoir in the centre that supplied water to the houses. In 1800 the Circus residents enclosed the central part of the open space as a garden.  Now, the central area is grassed over and is home to a group of large plane trees.

References

Bibliography
 Michael Forsyth, Bath, Pevsner Architectural Guides, Yale University Press, 2003.
 Jean Manco, The Hub of the Circus: A history of the streetscape of the Circus, Bath (Bath and North East Somerset Council 2004).

External links

 Bath Past: The Circus — an article by Jean Manco.

Houses completed in 1768
Grade I listed buildings in Bath, Somerset
Crescents (architecture)
Parks and open spaces in Bath, Somerset
Streets in Bath, Somerset
1768 establishments in Great Britain